Terrence Jones Sr. (born April 13, 1968) is a professional footballer and manager, and the current coach of New Vibes and United States Virgin Islands.

References

External links
U.S.Virgin Islands at FIFA.com

1968 births
Living people
United States Virgin Islands soccer players
United States Virgin Islands soccer coaches
United States Virgin Islands national soccer team managers
Association football goalkeepers
Association football forwards
United States Virgin Islands international soccer players